Lake Pomacochas or Lake Pomacocha (possibly from Quechua puma cougar, puma, qucha lake) is a lake in Peru located near the town of  Florida, Bongará Province, Amazonas.

See also
List of lakes in Peru

References

Lakes of Amazonas Region
Lakes of Peru